Sacred caves and peak sanctuaries are characteristic holy places of ancient Minoan Crete. Most scholars agree that sacred caves were used by the Minoans for religious rites, and some for burial. While all peak sanctuaries have clay human figurines, only Idaeon, Trapeza and Psychro have them among the sacred caves. Clay body parts, also called votive body parts, common among peak sanctuaries, appear in no caves with the exception of a bronze leg in Psychro.

One author, Tyree (1974), restricts "sacred caves" to those with architectural additions such as "paved areas, partition walls, and low walls surrounding stalagmites", as well as the presence (upon excavation) of "cult implements" of various kinds. 

Some were "burial caves", used in the Neolithic and Early Minoan periods as secondary burial sites for a community. It is thought that the primary burial site was probably a tholos beehive tomb in the area, from which remains were moved into the cave after a period. Whether this usage overlapped with usage for religious cult, or whether the two phases were distinct, is uncertain and a matter of discussion.

List of sacred caves
 Arkalochori
Hagios Charalambos - burial cave
 Inatos
 Kamares, where Kamares ware was first found
 Mameloukou
 Phaneromeni
 Skotino
Stravomyti

Notes

References
 Jones, Donald W. 1999 Peak Sanctuaries and Sacred Caves of Minoan Crete 
 "INSTAP": Louise C. Langford-Verstegen, Costis Davaras, Eleni Stravopodi,  Hagios Charalambos: A Minoan Burial Cave in Crete: II, The Pottery, 2016, INSTAP Academic Press, google books

Minoan religion
Caves of Greece
Landforms of Crete
Crete
Minoan sites in Crete